Gosmore is a hamlet in the parish of St Ippolyts (where the population at the 2011 Census was included) near Hitchin in Hertfordshire, England.  One interesting feature is Bunyan's Dell, a natural amphitheatre deep inside Wain Wood where the author of The Pilgrim's Progress preached in secret when his faith was persecuted after the Restoration.

References

External links

Hamlets in Hertfordshire
North Hertfordshire District
Areas of Hitchin